Temur Javakhishvili, known professionally as Temo Javakhi, is a Georgian contemporary artist born in 1951. He graduated from Tbilisi State Academy of Arts in 1976. Javakhi works in various mediums - video art, installation, painting, action/performance art). Javakhi shows his individual approach of conceptual analysis by playing with Dadaist forms, using postmodernist irony and expression.

Career 
From 1985 he has been a member of the Artists Union in Georgia. Since 2015 Temo Javakhi has been working as a visiting professor at Tbilisi State Academy of Arts. From 1976 until now, he has participated in up to 80 exhibitions and international projects.

In 2022, T. Javakhi participated in a Hôtel Drouot auction with his painting "Man with a pipe" estimated at 1000-1500 EUR.

T. Javakhi works in different mediums and creates with different non-traditional materials: in addition to conceptual easel works, artistic word objects, photo art, and installations, the artist works in video art.

The artist has been participating in exhibitions since 1976, both in Georgia and abroad, and in the 1990s. In 2010 he participated in the exhibition project Do Not Try to Understand Me, held at the Villa Arson Center for Contemporary Art in Paris (Curators: E. Mangion. and S. Pluot.). He  frequently participates in different French, German, and other foreign projects. His works are displayed next to artists like Marcel Duchamp, Kazimir Malevich, Nam June Paik, Le Corbusier, David Kakabadze, Niko Pirosmani, Sergo Parajanov, Richard Serra, Hans Scheib, Hans Hendrik Grimmling, Marina Abramovich, and others.

In August 2016, the Tbilisi National Gallery hosted a large personal exhibition of the artist: Word Objects - MIRRORIMM. Around 150 of the artist's works were presented: art objects, visual documentation, 11 samples of video art, word objects, and installations, also the series The Knight in the Panther's Skin, which is preserved in the archives of the Georgian National Museum. T. Javakhi started his active work in the field of contemporary art in 1983, but before that, he had done some early experimental videos and conceptual works.

List of Exhibitions and Projects (Selected) 

 2019 - "Invalid Memorabilia", G. Leonidze State Museum of Georgian Literature, Tbilisi, Georgia
 2018 - International group exhibition - "State of Play", Aliyev Contemporary Art Center, Baku, Azerbaijan
 2018 - International group exhibition, "State of Play", Contemporary Art Gallery, Karvasla, Tbilisi, Georgia
 2016 - Solo exhibition  MIRRORRIM, National Gallery, Tbilisi, Georgia
 2015 - Project "The Knight in the Panther's Skin (Vepkhistkaosani ) -  Artist's book", Georgian National Museum, Tbilisi, Georgia
 2015 - International exhibition "A letter finds the addressee"  Paris, France; New York, USA
 2014 - International project "Font", Tbilisi, Georgia; Bochum, Germany
 2013 - International exhibition "Georgian Video Art", Aarhus, Denmark
 2012 - Underground of 1980-90's, Tbilisi National Gallery, Georgia
 2012 - International exhibition, gallery "Alte Schule Adlershof", Berlin, Germany
 2011 - International  project "TRANS", Contemporary Art Center, Paris, France
 2010 - International  project "Stop Trying to Understand Me", Nice, France
 2009 - International exhibition "Tbilisi Underground",Nantes, France
 2008 - International exhibition, Frankfurt, Marburg, Germany
 2003 - International forum "Caucasus" (Photography, Video, Cinema) Strasbourg,  Mulhouse, France
 2002 - International project "Art-Agitation", Yekaterinburg, Russia
 1999 - Solo project "From East to West", N - Gallery, Tbilisi, Georgia
 1998 - Performance "Kart-Veli" (Georgian), Tbilisi, Georgia
 1997 - Solo project "TRANS" and video "Silk Man", Old Gallery, Tbilisi, Georgia
 1994 - Solo exhibition "P.S." Tbilisi State Theatre of Marionettes, Georgia
 1991 - Solo exhibition "Lettrism",Tbilisi History Museum Karvasla, Georgia
 1976 -  Exhibition "Young Artists", National Gallery,Tbilisi, Georgia

References 

Living people
1951 births
20th-century artists from Georgia (country)
20th-century painters from Georgia (country)
21st-century artists from Georgia (country)
21st-century painters from Georgia (country)
Tbilisi State Academy of Arts alumni
Video artists
Installation artists
Performance artists
Postmodern artists
Academic staff of the Tbilisi State Academy of Arts